The second season of Private Practice, the spin-off series to Grey's Anatomy, premiered on October 1, 2008, and concluded on April 30, 2009. The season consisted of 22 episodes.

Plot
The first half of the second season dealt with the practice's financial troubles. Naomi reveals to Addison that they are in danger of losing the practice due to unpaid debt causing Addison to tell Sam. This in turn causes a shift within the practice making Addison the new boss. Adding to the drama was the competition of a new practice, Pacific Wellcare. This new practice, located within the same building as Oceanside Wellness, was run by Charlotte causing turmoil for her and Cooper.

Another happening within this season is the dynamic between Sam and Naomi who by the finale realize they can no longer be friends as well as the deepening romantic relationship of Cooper and Charlotte. Addison was romantically linked with Kevin Nelson (played by David Sutcliffe), a police officer, but later realized their relationship was going nowhere. Towards the end of the season, Addison falls in love with cardiovascular surgeon Noah Barnes, who as it turns out, is married and is expecting his first child. Matters become more complicated when Addison realizes that Noah's wife is one of her patients. Archer Montgomery (Grant Show), Addison's playboy brother, also made sporadic appearances causing trouble for her and Naomi. Archer was found to be with an aggressive brain tumor which was later diagnosed as parasites. Addison sought the professional help of her ex-husband, Derek Shepherd (Patrick Dempsey). After Derek successfully saved Archer, Addison discovered he was back to his old tricks cheating on Naomi.

Violet stirred some of her own drama when she began dating Sheldon (Brian Benben), who works for Pacific Wellcare, and Pete. During the latter half of the season, Violet was found to be pregnant although she did not know who the father of her baby was. Furthermore, Violet found herself and her unborn baby at the mercy of a psychotic patient bent on taking Violet's baby by any means necessary in the closing moments of the season finale. Meanwhile, Dell struggled with his own issues caused by his former girlfriend's drug habits and the fight for custody of his daughter Betsey. Some of the medical cases that caused a stir and tension among the doctors at Private Practice was the issue of abortion (a first for the practice), the sex reassignment of a newborn, the sexual activity of a 12-year-old, the switching of embryos for two mothers-to-be and a young couple who later discovered they were siblings.

Cast and characters

Main cast
 Kate Walsh as Addison Montgomery
 Tim Daly as Pete Wilder
 Audra McDonald as Naomi Bennett
 Paul Adelstein as Cooper Freedman
 KaDee Strickland as Charlotte King
 Chris Lowell as Dell Parker
 Taye Diggs as Sam Bennett
 Amy Brenneman as Violet Turner

Recurring cast
 David Sutcliffe as Kevin Nelson
 Geffri Maya as Maya Bennett
 Brian Benben as Sheldon Wallace
 Hailey Sole as Betsey Parker
 Grant Show as Archer Montgomery
 James Morrison as William White
 Jayne Brook as Meg Porter
 Jay Harrington as Wyatt Lockhart
 Sharon Leal as Sonya
 Amanda Detmer as Morgan Barnes
 Josh Hopkins as Noah Barnes
 Agnes Bruckner as Heather
 Amanda Foreman as Katie Kent
 Sean Bridgers as Frank

Special guest stars
 Justin Chambers as Alex Karev
 Chandra Wilson as Miranda Bailey
 James Pickens Jr. as Richard Webber
 Eric Dane as Mark Sloan
 Patrick Dempsey as Derek Shepherd

Guest stars
 Idina Menzel as Lisa King
 Alexis Denisof as Daniel

Episodes

Ratings

U.S.

United Kingdom
In the second season, Private Practice aired on Thursdays at 9pm (then 10pm) on Living, with the episode airing again (which aired that night) on Living+1 an hour later and on Living+2 two hours later.

DVD release

References

2008 American television seasons
2009 American television seasons
Private Practice (TV series) seasons